Isn't Life Wonderful! is a 1953 British technicolor period comedy film directed by Harold French and starring Cecil Parker, Eileen Herlie and Donald Wolfit. The film was shot at the Elstree Studios of Associated British with sets designed by the art director Terence Verity. It was released in the United States as Uncle Willie's Bicycle Shop, the title of Brock Williams original 1948 novel based on his boyhood experiences.

Plot
In Edwardian England, alcoholic Uncle Willie (Donald Wolfit) is an embarrassment to his family. Head of the household father (Cecil Parker), decides to set Willie up as the manager of a bicycle shop, hoping to impress visiting American heiress Virginia van Stuyden (Dianne Foster). The surprise for everyone comes when Uncle Willie's little shop begins to prosper.

Cast

 Cecil Parker as Father
 Eileen Herlie as Mother
 Donald Wolfit as Uncle Willie
 Peter Asher as Charles
 Eleanor Summerfield as Aunt Kate
 Dianne Foster as Virginia van Stuyden
 Robert Urquhart as Frank
 Russell Waters as Green
 Cecil Trouncer as Dr. Barsmith
 Philip Stainton as Dr. Mason
 Edwin Styles as Bamboula
 Arthur Young as Sir George Probus
 Fabia Drake as Lady Probus
 Alec Finter as Uncle Richard
 Cicely Paget-Bowman as Aunt Theo
 Basil Cunard as Uncle Henry
 Viola Lyel as 	Aunt Jane
 John Welsh as Uncle James
 Margot Lister as Aunt Betsy
 Henry Hewitt as 	Cousin Arthur
 George Woodbridge as 	Cockie
 Wensley Pithey as 	Sam

Critical reception
TV Guide called it "A pleasant little charmer"; while Sky Cinema wrote, "Director Harold French skilfully milks its situations for all they are worth...No big stars in this film, which makes it an unexpected treat. Based on an equally entertaining novel Uncle Willie and the Bicycle Shop. Donald Wolfit stars as the alcoholic Uncle Willie, Cecil Parker suffers splendidly as Father."

References

External links
Isn't Life Wonderful! at BFI

1953 films
Films directed by Harold French
Films set in England
Films based on British novels
Films set in 1902
British historical comedy films
1950s historical comedy films
1953 comedy films
Films shot at Associated British Studios
1950s English-language films
1950s British films